The Danish Men's Handball League, formerly known as Herrehåndboldligaen is the men's top Danish professional handball league. The winners of the Danish Men's Handball League are recognised as the Danish men's handball champions. The current champions are GOG Håndbold.

Season
The Danish Men's Handball League season consists of 14 teams, each playing 26 regular season games.  The eight best teams of the regular season advance to further games, where they are divided into two groups of four teams each. No. 1 and 2 from the regular season start with 2 points.  No. 3 and 4 start with 1 point, while no. 5-8 start with no points. After these six games the two top teams in each group will play semifinals. No. 1 from one group is up against no. 2 from the other. The winners will meet in finals, while the losers will play against each other for the bronze medal. Semifinals, finals, and bronze games are all played in best of 3.

The lowest placed team of the regular season is directly relegated to the second-best division, and replaced by the winner of this. The teams finishing as 9, 10, 11, 12 and 13 are put in a group where they will play against each other. In the second-best division, the teams that end up 2nd and 3rd will play against each other in best of 3. The winner of those games will get to meet the lowest placed team from the 9-13 group from the top league, yet again in best of 3. The winner will get to play in the top league next season, while the loser plays in the second-best division.

Teams
The season of 2021/22, 15 teams will be participating instead of the usual 14. The cause for this is that Aarhus Håndbold went bankrupt during last season and was removed from the league, and the rules says that therefore the lowest placed team, TMS Ringsted, had the right to keep their place in the league. However, this was discovered after Skive fH already had qualified. Nordsjælland won the second-best league and are therefore also qualified for Håndboldligaen. In conclusion, the only solution was to have 15 teams this season.

The teams for the 2021-22 season are:

Champions 
The complete list of the Danish men's handball champions since 1936.

Total titles won
The following clubs have won the Danish championship.

EHF coefficients

The following data indicates Danish coefficient rankings between European handball leagues.

Country ranking
EHF League Ranking for 2021/22 season:

5.  (3)  Super Liga (93.00)
6.  (6)  Polish Superliga (77.00)
7.  (6)  Danish Handball League (74.50)
8.  (9)  1ª Divisão (69.00)
9.  (8)  Croatian Premier Handball League (46.33)

Club ranking
EHF Club Ranking as of 14 July 2022:
 7.  Aalborg (424)
 15.  GOG (315)
 37.  Bjerringbro-Silkeborg (135)
 51.  TTH Holstebro (100)
 54.  Skjern (94)

See also

 Danish Women's Handball League

References

External links
 Current league statistics
 League history
 Top goalscorer

Handball competitions in Denmark
Denmark
Professional sports leagues in Denmark